Július Toček (29 September 1939 – 7 October 2004) was a Slovak rower who competed for Czechoslovakia in the 1964 Summer Olympics.

He was born in Margecany and died in Winterthur, Switzerland. In 1964 he was a crew member of the Czechoslovak boat which won the bronze medal in the men's eight event.

References

1939 births
2004 deaths
Slovak male rowers
Czechoslovak male rowers
Olympic rowers of Czechoslovakia
Rowers at the 1964 Summer Olympics
Olympic bronze medalists for Czechoslovakia
Olympic medalists in rowing
Medalists at the 1964 Summer Olympics